Acanthograptidae is an extinct family of graptolites.

Genera
List of genera from Maletz (2014):

†Acanthograpsus Spencer, 1878
†Archaeodictyota Obut & Sobolevskaya, 1967
†Boiophyton Obrhel, 1959
†Coremagraptus Bulman, 1942
†Koremagraptus Bulman, 1927b
†Palaeodictyota Whitfield, 1902
†Saxonia Roselt, 1962
†Trimerohydra Kozłowski, 1959

References

Graptolites
Prehistoric hemichordate families